Alexandru Daniel Buziuc (born 15 March 1994) is a Romanian footballer who plays as a forward for Liga I club CS Mioveni. He made his Liga I debut on May 4, 2013 in a match against U Cluj.

Statistics 
''Statistics accurate as of match played 10 March 2023

Honours
Gaz Metan Mediaș
Liga II: 2015–16

FCSB
Supercupa României runner-up: 2020

References

External links
 
 

1994 births
Living people
Sportspeople from Suceava
Romanian footballers
Romania under-21 international footballers
Association football forwards
Liga I players
Liga II players
Liga III players
FC Vaslui players
CS Gaz Metan Mediaș players
ACS Foresta Suceava players
LPS HD Clinceni players
FC Steaua București players
CS Mioveni players